Gloris Veseli (born 1 October 2000) is an Albanian professional footballer who plays as a defender for FK Shënkolli.

Career statistics

Club

References

2000 births
Living people
People from Lezhë
Albanian footballers
Association football defenders
KF Shënkolli players
Kategoria e Parë players